Spodnja Rečica is a settlement in the Municipality of Laško in eastern Slovenia. It lies in the valley of a minor right tributary of the Savinja River, just north of Laško. The area is part of the traditional region of Styria. It is now included with the rest of the municipality in the Savinja Statistical Region.

History
Spodnja Rečica became a separate settlement in 1984, when the former village of Rečica was divided into Zgornja Rečica and Spodnja Rečica. Its territory was further adjusted in 1994, when Spodnja Rečica annexed part of the village of Slivno, and in 2000, when part of the settlement was annexed by the town of Laško.

References

External links
Spodnja Rečica on Geopedia

Populated places in the Municipality of Laško